"Sanctify Yourself" is a song released by Scottish rock band Simple Minds as the second single from their seventh studio album Once Upon a Time in January 1986. The song reached number 10 in the UK Singles Chart and number 14 on the US Billboard Hot 100.

Background
Singer Jim Kerr said about the song, "It came from Jimmy Iovine, who produced us. We had the riff for that. We all like gospel music and we're big fans of Sly & the Family Stone, as well. They were quite an influence on that song."

Reception
Cash Box said that it "finds the friendly, warm sound of Simple Minds in full bloom."

Charts

Weekly charts

Year-end charts

References

1985 songs
Simple Minds songs
Song recordings produced by Jimmy Iovine
Song recordings produced by Bob Clearmountain
Virgin Records singles
Songs written by Jim Kerr
Songs written by Charlie Burchill
Songs written by Mick MacNeil